George Masangkay Canseco (April 23, 1934 – November 19, 2004) was a Filipino composer and former politician. He composed numerous popular Filipino songs.

Early years
Canseco studied and graduated with a Liberal Arts degree at University of the East in the Philippines. After graduation, he worked for The Philippines Herald and The Associated Press as a journalist. He also freelanced as a scriptwriter for hire in Manila. Canseco was commissioned by former Philippines First lady, Imelda Marcos, to compose the national tribute hymn, "Ako ay Pilipino".

Later career
Canseco wrote the classic "Kapantay ay Langit", a theme from the award-winning Motion Picture sung by Amapola. It was later popularized by Pilita Corrales, which eventually became her signature song. It also had an English version titled "You're All I Love" that was sung by American singer Vic Dana that included some Tagalog lines. The song won the Manila Film Festival Best Song Of The Year Award in 1972. Canseco followed it with an English song entitled "Songs" exclusively for "Songs and Amapola" under the Vicor Music Corporation Pioneer Label. Canseco's best-known composition, however, was "Child", the English-language version of Freddie Aguilar's signature song "Anák". He wrote for Sharon Cuneta and Basil Valdez, and his songs were also recorded by Regine Velasquez, Zsa Zsa Padilla, Pilita Corrales, Martin Nievera, and Kuh Ledesma. Rey Valera was a lyricist of two of Canseco's songs.

Canseco credited film producer and Vicor Music Corporation owner Vic del Rosario for his biggest break in the music industry. Canseco was elected President of the Filipino Society of Composers, Authors and Publishers, Inc. in 1973, and also elected a councilor for the First District of Quezon City from 1988–1992 and 1998–2001.

Death
On November 20 2004, Canseco died due to cancer at the age of 70 in the National Kidney Institute, Quezon City, Philippines.

Filmography
Composer

Muling Ibalik ang Tamis ng Pag-Ibig (1998)
Paano ang Ngayon Kung Wala ang Kahapon (1995)
Ikaw (1993)
Ngayon at Kailanman (1992)
Imortal (1989)
Ang Babaeng Nawawala sa Sarili (1989)
Babangon Ako't Dudurugin Kita (1989)
Langit at Lupa impyerno, im-im-impyerno (1988)
Paano Tatakasan ang Bukas? (1988)
Saan Nagtatago ang Pag-Ibig? (1987)
Kung Aagawin Mo ang Lahat sa Akin (1987)
Huwag Mong Itanong Kung Bakit (1986)
Magdusa Ka! (1986)
Iyo ang Tondo Kanya ang Cavite (1986)
Kailan Tama ang Mali (1986)
Bomba Arienda (1985)
Paradise Inn (1985)
Kailan Sasabihing Mahal Kita (1985)
Tinik sa Dibdib (1985)
Muling Buksan ang Puso (1985)
Isla (1985)
Muntinlupa (1984)
Sa Hirap at Ginhawa (1984)
Minanong Magat (1984)
Sampung Ahas ni Eva (1984)
Somewhere (1984)
Piesta (1984)
Daddy's Little Darlings (1984)
Apoy sa Iyong Kandungan (1984)
Dapat Ka Bang Mahalin? (1984)
Pieta: Ikalawang Aklat (1984)
Laruan (1983)
Dugong Buhay (1983)
Minsan Pa Nating Hagkan ang Nakaraan (1983)
Saan Darating ang Umaga? (1983)
Sa Bawat Tunog ng Kampana (1983)
To Love Again (1983)
Pieta (1983)
Paano Ba ang Mangarap? (1983)
Sana Bukas Pa ang Kahapon (1983)
Palabra de Honor (1983)
Friends in Love (1983)
Mga Alagad ng Kuwadradong Mesa (1983)
Moral (1982)
Bambang (1982)
Gaano Kadalas ang Minsan? (1982)
Lalake Ako (1982)
Cross My Heart (1982)
Sinasamba Kita (1982)
Alyas Palos Ii (1982)
Forgive and Forget (1982)
Mga Uod at Rosas (1982)
Magkano ... ang Kalayaan Mo (1982)
My Only Love (1982)
P.S. I Love You (1981)
Bawal (1981)
Dear Heart (1981)
Legs Katawan Babae (1981)
Hari ng Stunt (1981)
Flor de Liza (1981)
Ang Babaing Hinugot sa Aking Tadyang (1981)
High School Scandal (1981)
Brutal (1980)
Kung Ako'y Iiwan Mo (1980)
Langis at Tubig (1980)
Broken Home (1980)
Lumakad Kang Hubad... sa Mundong Ibabaw (1980)
Kastilyong Buhangin (1980)
Bubot na Bayabas (1980)
Pagbabalik ng mga Tigre (1980)
Miss X (1980)
Nakaw na Pag-Ibig (1980)
Kadete (1979)
Star (1979)
Aliw (1979)
Pag-Ibig, Bakit Ka Ganyan? (1979)
Hiwaga (1979)
Huwag (1979)
Biyak na Manyika (1979)
Menor de Edad (1979)
Coed (1979)
Huwag, Bayaw (1979)
Atsay (1978)
Katawang Alabok (1978)
Kid Kaliwete (1978)
Dyesebel (1978)
Lalaki, Ikaw ang Dahilan (1978)
Kukulog, Kikidlat sa Tanghaling Tapat' (1978)
 Miss Dulce Amor, Ina (1978)
 Pagputi ng Uwak... Pag-Itim ng Tagak (1978)
 Isang Gabi sa Iyo... Isang Gabi sa Akin (1978)
 Topo-Topo Barega (1978)Sa Lungga ng mga Daga (1978)
 Mananayaw (1978)
 Doble Kara (1978)
 Hubad sa Mundo (1978)
 Bakit Kailangan Kita (1978)Burlesk Queen (1977)Dalagang Ina (1977)
 Bawat Himaymay ng Aking Laman (1977)Ang Diwata (1977)
 Pang Umaga, Pang Tanghali, Pang Gabi (1977)
 Hagdan-Hagdan ang Daan sa Langit (1976)
 Makamandag si Adora (1976)
 Malvarosa (1976)
 Hinog sa Pilit (1976)
 Mga Rosas sa Putikan (1976)
 May Langit ang Bawat Nilikha (1976)
 Wanted ... Ded or Alayb (1976)
 Mrs. Eva Fonda, 16 (1976)
 Hugasan Mo ang Aking Kasalaman (1976)
 Saan Ka Pupunta, Miss Lutgarda Nicolas? (1975)
 Batu-Bato sa Langit: Ang Tamaa'y Huwag Magagalit (1975)
 Niño Valiente (1975)
 Hello, Goodnight, Goodbye (1975)
 Ang Inyong Linkod—Matutina (1975)Vilma and the Beep Beep Minica (1974)
 Magsikap: Kayod sa Araw, Kayod sa Gabi (1974)
 Babalik Ka Rin (1973)
 Kapantay Ay Langit'' (1971)

Awards

References

External links

1934 births
2004 deaths
Deaths from cancer in the Philippines
Filipino OPM composers
Musicians from Cavite
Quezon City Council members
University of the East alumni
The Philippines Herald